Mohamaad Ghibran (often credited as M. Ghibran) is an Indian composer. He has composed music for Indian films, advertising films and television commercial jingles in different languages.

Early life
Mohammad Ghibran was born and raised in Coimbatore. When he was in the tenth grade, his family relocated to Chennai after his father suffered a severe loss in business. He had to discontinue studies and do several jobs to support his family.

Ghibran said that he had developed an interest in music after he had seen Yanni perform on TV, when he was about eight or ten. He had enrolled into a music college, but had to drop out and instead attended keyboard classes and learnt keyboard part-time from Paul Augustine. He completed RSA Grade 8 in both piano and music theory through Trinity College London, and obtained a degree in classical composition and film scoring under Australian Composer Lindsay Vickery at the LASALLE College of the Arts, Singapore. He received an offer to compose music for animations as an in-house composer, and worked there for two years. In 2000, he set up his own studio and over the next six years composed for over 700 ads.

In Singapore, he worked part-time composing music for media houses to meet his expenses. After completing his works, he worked for the Singapore wood and percussion instruments orchestra. He subsequently returned to India, but could not find many advertisements to work on there.

Career

The director A. Sarkunam selected Ghibran to compose the soundtrack for Vaagai Sooda Vaa. N. Venkateswaran of The Times of India wrote of the soundtrack, "M Ghibran joins the list of debut composers who have impressed with their work in recent times. The music score complements the movie, and marks him out as a musician to watch out for". Malathi Rangarajan from The Hindu wrote that "Music is another highlight. M. Gibran's numbers keep ringing in your ears long after you leave the cinema". Rajagopalan Badrinarayanan from musicperk.com wrote "Vaagai Sooda Vaa is a wholesome package with wonderful songs. Being his first movie Gibran has done a great job with the musical score. The album will surely reshuffle the current chart". Ghibran said that after Vaagai Sooda Vaa and that he was then approached by several directors about other projects, but he decided to take a break to look for an urban based script.

In 2013, Ghibran composed the music for the films Vatthikuchi, Kutti Puli and Naiyaandi. His 2014 releases were Thirumanam Ennum Nikkah and Amara Kaaviyam. He also had his first Telugu release Run Raja Run. According to Behindwoods.com, his work in the film "garnered great appreciation from the fans" and the songs had been "in the top of the charts for a long time". He was offered soundtrack work for Vishwaroopam II by Kamal Haasan, as well as his next two projects, Uttama Villain and Papanasam, the Tamil remake of Drishyam.

Ghibran currently shuttles between Chennai, Mumbai and Singapore for all his recording works, and owns a studio in Chennai.

Personal life
Ghibran is married to a Telugu woman from Vijayawada, a scientist, whom he met in Singapore. Ghibran's first child, a son was born on 18 December 2014. His elder brother A. G. Amid is a director.

Discography
 Films

Television

Upcoming projects

Independent works and Music videos

Awards

References

External links

Ghibran - GYFHOM (Get Your Freaking Hands Off Me) | Tamil
Get Your Freaking Hands Off Me “GYFHOM” Album Launch
Composer Ghibran's single will chronicle harassment against women

Tamil film score composers
Telugu film score composers
Living people
Year of birth missing (living people)
People from Coimbatore